Berry Mountain is a locality in the City of Shoalhaven in New South Wales, Australia. It lies west of the Princes Highway on the Kangaroo Valley Road between Berry and Kangaroo Valley. It lies about 23 kilometre north of Nowra and about 160 km south of Sydney. It lies on a ridge and is partly covered by temperate rain forest and partly by grasslands that were formerly used for dairying, but are now mainly used for rural residences.

References

City of Shoalhaven
Localities in New South Wales